Jeroen Hoencamp (born 27 August 1966) is a Dutch businessman who currently serves as chief executive officer (CEO) of VodafoneZiggo since 1 January 2017.

Early life
He is from the Netherlands. He gained a bachelor's degree in Business from Nyenrode Business University, in Breukelen, Utrecht (province).

Career
He served his conscription period as an officer in the Royal Netherlands Marine Corps. He worked in the USA, and returned to the Netherlands in 1994. He acquired an MBA.

Vodafone
He joined Vodafone Netherlands in 1998, later becoming its Director of Enterprise in 2006.

He served as CEO of Vodafone Ireland from 2010 until 2012, later becoming the Chief Executive of Vodafone UK from 2013 until 2016.

See also
 Ronan Dunne, boss of O2 UK since January 2008
 David Dyson, boss of Three UK since June 2011
 Philipp Humm, Vodafone's Chief Executive for central and northern Europe

References

1966 births
Dutch chief executives in the technology industry
Nyenrode Business University alumni
Royal Netherlands Marine Corps officers
Vodafone people
Living people